Charles John Thomason was an American baseball outfielder in the Negro leagues. He played with the Newark Eagles in 1943 and 1942.

References

External links
 and Seamheads

Year of birth missing
Year of death missing
Baseball outfielders
Newark Eagles players